Gilberto William Fabbro or simply William (born March 30, 1977, in Foz do Iguaçu), is a Brazilian attacking midfielder. He currently plays for Operário Ferroviário Esporte Clube.

Honours
Paraná State League: 1998, 2001
Brazilian League (2nd division): 1998
Santa Catarina State League: 2002

External links
 sambafoot

 furacao
 globoesporte

1977 births
Living people
People from Foz do Iguaçu
Brazilian footballers
Club Athletico Paranaense players
Sociedade Esportiva do Gama players
São José Esporte Clube players
Figueirense FC players
Esporte Clube Juventude players
CD Tenerife players
Al-Sailiya SC players
Associação Atlética Ponte Preta players
Brazilian expatriate footballers
Expatriate footballers in Qatar
Brazilian expatriate sportspeople in Qatar
Qatar Stars League players
Association football midfielders
Sportspeople from Paraná (state)